Godwinia is a common name for two different groupings of organisms:
Godwinia (plant), a genus of monocotyledonous shrubs of the family Araceae
Godwinia (gastropod), a genus of terrestrial snails from family Oxychilidae native to Hawaii